Ludowici  is a city in Long County, Georgia, United States. The population was 1,703 at the 2010 census and an estimated 2,221 in 2018. The city is the county seat of Long County. It is a part of the Hinesville-Fort Stewart metropolitan statistical area.

The town, which was originally called Johnston Station, had its beginnings in the 1840s when the Atlantic and Gulf Railroad established a stop referred to as "Four and a Half". The station was constructed across from the house of a landowner named Allen Johnston.

The Long County Courthouse and Ludowici Well Pavilion are listed on the National Register of Historic Places listings in Long County, Georgia.

History

In 1900, the population was about 300 and Johnston Station had a telegraph, post, and express offices. H. F. McKay, an African American Republican, was elected to the Georgia Senate to represent Liberty County the same year. He lived in the area of Johnston Station.

In 1904, German entrepreneur Carl Ludowici built the "Dixie" plant for the Ludowici Roofing Tile Co., in Johnson Station. In 1905, when the town erected a new high school, the Ludowici family donated towards its construction costs and provided the roofing tile. In return, on August 23, 1905, the town was renamed and incorporated as Ludowici.

Tiles manufactured from this plant were stamped "Ludowici Dixie". "Dixie" tile can still be found throughout Georgia and Florida, on such prominent buildings as the U.S. Federal Building in Savannah and Flagler College in St. Augustine, Florida, as well as numerous homes in Ludowici and the surrounding communities. The plant closed in 1914. The Ludowici Roof Tile Company still exists, but the company's plant is in New Lexington, Ohio.

Before interstate highways were constructed, all motorists traveled on regular U.S. highways. Ludowici was at the crossroads of three U.S. highways, Routes 25, 82 and 301. Many vacationers on their way to Florida passed through Ludowici.

Speed Trap Designation

The city gained notoriety during the 1950s and 1960s for its aggressive traffic enforcement policies. The AAA went so far as to specifically label Ludowici as a speed trap. Members of the local police force were allegedly engaging in manipulation of the timing of the traffic signal downtown, so as to catch unsuspecting out-of-area motorists "running" a suddenly changed red light. The switch for the stop light was located in the barber shop. The traffic light was at an intersection that was bypassed by a shortcut (Main Street – see a local map) so that local residents would not even come to the light when making the turn at the light. Thus, all the tickets went to nonresidents without the police having to be selective since no locals would be at the light. A song was also written about the town.

Then-Governor Lester Maddox posted billboards warning tourists to avoid the town because ticket-related corruption was so bad. Word of mouth and media exposure caused many motorists to detour around Ludowici. A 1970 TIME article said that Ludowici was "one of the last remaining speed traps in the country." 

Reason reported that it wasn't the activity of Governor Maddox that ultimately ended the speed trap activities of the town, but rather that, "In the end, Ludowici was brought down not by Maddox, but by Interstate 95. Tourists no longer had to run a gauntlet of cops and flim-flam men to reach Florida's sunnier climes, and the town faded into well-deserved obscurity."

Geography
Nearby communities include Jesup  to the southwest via US Routes 301, 84, and 25; Darien  to the southeast via State Route 57; Hinesville/Fort Stewart  to the northeast via US 84; and Glennville  to the northwest via US 301 and 25.

The city drains west to Jones Creek and east to Doctors Creek, both tributaries of the Altamaha River.

Demographics

2020 census

As of the 2020 United States census, there were 1,590 people, 763 households, and 573 families residing in the city.

2000 census
As of the census of 2000, there were 1,440 people, 526 households, and 370 families residing in the city. The racial makeup of the city was 72.78% White, 23.82% African American, 1.18% Native American, 0.14% Asian, 0.14% Pacific Islander, 1.25% from other races, and 0.69% from two or more races. Hispanic or Latino of any race were 3.9% of the population.

There were 526 households, out of which 41.3% had children under the age of 18 living with them, 46.4% were married couples living together, 19.2% had a female householder with no husband present, and 29.5% were non-families. 24.1% of all households were made up of individuals, and 11.6% had someone living alone who was 65 years of age or older.  The average household size was 2.74 and the average family size was 3.27.

In the city, the population was spread out, with 33.6% under the age of 18, 11.7% from 18 to 24, 27.4% from 25 to 44, 16.6% from 45 to 64, and 10.7% who were 65 years of age or older.  The median age was 28 years. For every 100 females, there were 95.4 males.  For every 100 females age 18 and over, there were 87.5 males.

The median income for a household in the city was $27,386, and the median income for a family was $28,792. Males had a median income of $25,272 versus $16,250 for females. The per capita income for the city was $11,701.  About 18.5% of families and 18.1% of the population were below the poverty line, including 22.9% of those under age 18 and 15.8% of those age 65 or over.

Education

Long County School District
The Long County School District holds pre-school to grade twelve, and consists of two elementary schools, a middle school, and a high school. The district has 119 full-time teachers and over 3,285 students.
Smiley Elementary School
McClelland Elementary School 
Long County Middle School
Long County High School

Private education 
 Faith Baptist Christian School

References

External links

 City of Ludowici webpage
 Billboard placed by Gov. Maddox to warn motorists
 Article with a possible real ref
 Time article 1959
 History of Ludowici-Celadon, Inc.
 New Georgia Encyclopedia article
 Vanishing South Georgia

Cities in Georgia (U.S. state)
Cities in Long County, Georgia
County seats in Georgia (U.S. state)
Hinesville metropolitan area